Sultan Pur Majra is a census town in North West district in the Indian state of Delhi.

Demographics
 India census, Sultan Pur Majra had a population of 163,716. Males constitute 54% of the population and females 46%. Sultan Pur Majra has an average literacy rate of 61%, higher than the national average of 59.5%: male literacy is 69%, and female literacy is 51%. In Sultan Pur Majra, 16% of the population is under 6 years of age.

References

Cities and towns in North West Delhi district